Khusf Rural District is in the Central District of Khusf County, South Khorasan province, Iran. At the National Census of 2006, its population (as a part of the former Khusf District of Birjand County) was 9,419 in 2,703 households. There were 11,464 inhabitants in 2,853 households at the following census of 2011. At the most recent census of 2016, the population of the rural district was 6,466 in 2,092 households, by which time the district had been separated from the county and Khusf County established with two new districts. The largest of its 49 villages was Taqab, with 967 people.

References 

Khusf County

Rural Districts of South Khorasan Province

Populated places in South Khorasan Province

Populated places in Khusf County